Saugus is a neighborhood in Santa Clarita, California. It was one of four communities (with Valencia, Newhall and Canyon Country) that merged in 1987 to create the city of Santa Clarita. Saugus includes the central and north-central portions of the city. It is named after Saugus, Massachusetts, the hometown of Henry Newhall, upon whose land the town was originally built.

History
Saugus was first named Newhall by Henry Mayo Newhall, who bought the eastern half of the Del Valle family's Rancho San Francisco from a series of speculators.  After he moved the town south in 1879, he renamed the original site for his birthplace, Saugus, Massachusetts.

The Saugus Cafe was established in 1886 on San Fernando Road (now Railroad Avenue). It is the oldest continuously operating restaurant in Los Angeles County.

The Saugus Speedway first opened in 1939, initially known as Bonelli Stadium. It was the venue for several NASCAR races before its closure in 1995. The Saugus Speedway continues to be the venue for the Santa Clarita Swap Meet.

The 1984 movie Meatballs Part II was filmed here. The movie starred Richard Mulligan, Paul Reubens, and Kim Richards. 

In 1987, the city of Santa Clarita was incorporated, encompassing Saugus and the neighboring communities of Canyon Country, Newhall, and part of Valencia.

On November 14, 2019, a mass shooting took place at Saugus High School. That morning, Nathaniel Berhow, a 16-year-old junior at the school, used a semi-automatic pistol to shoot five other students, killing two of them, before turning his gun on himself. The shooting lasted 16 seconds. Survivors were reunited with their parents at nearby Central Park, and injured students were sent to Henry Mayo Hospital in Valencia and Providence Holy Cross Medical Center in Mission Hills. The shooter succumbed to his self-inflicted injuries the following day in the hospital. A vigil honoring the victims was held at Central Park the next day.

Education
Elementary school students in Saugus attend schools in the Saugus Union School District. Junior high and high school students attend schools in the William S. Hart Union High School District. Most junior high and high school students in Saugus attend Arroyo Seco Junior High School and Saugus High School; some attend nearby Golden Valley, Hart, and Valencia High Schools and the corresponding junior high schools.

Transportation
Saugus is located on the path of the Metrolink Antelope Valley Line. The line's Santa Clarita station is located in Saugus on the south side of Soledad Canyon Road. Bouquet Canyon Road is a major thoroughfare through Saugus, running northeast-southwest from the Angeles National Forest north of the city to Magic Mountain Parkway on the border with Valencia. Other major thoroughfares in Saugus include Seco Canyon Road, Haskell Canyon Road, Plum Canyon Road, Soledad Canyon Road, Newhall Ranch Road, Copper Hill Drive, and Golden Valley Road. All aforementioned streets except for Copper Hill Drive and Golden Valley Road intersect Bouquet Canyon Road; Copper Hill Drive is connected to Bouquet Canyon Road by David Way, a short residential street.

Demographics
As of 2019, the population of the 91350 zip code (which encompasses most of Saugus) was 36,173. The median household income in 91350 was $117,707. The part of Saugus north of Copper Hill Drive is in zip code 91390, shared with parts of unincorporated Canyon Country and all of Agua Dulce and Green Valley.

Notable people
Red Callender, jazz musician
Harry Carey, actor
Harry Carey Jr., actor
Frank Coghlan Jr., actor and naval aviator
Mandy Gonzalez, actress and singer
Ross Lonsberry, professional hockey player
Nick Nickson, Los Angeles Kings announcer
Ruby Rose Turner, actress
Abbey Weitzeil, Olympic swimmer

See also
Central Park - the largest city park in Santa Clarita, located in Saugus
San Gabriel Fault
Santa Clarita Valley
Saugus Speedway

References

External links
Santa Clarita Valley Historical Society: History of Saugus website — photos, text, TV shows.

Neighborhoods in Santa Clarita, California